Oded Baloush is an Israeli former professional association footballer who played for Maccabi Haifa and the San Diego Sockers.

Playing career 
Baloush made his league debut in a match against Bnei Yehuda on 29 December 1973.

External links
 Profile and biography of Oded Balous on Maccabi Haifa's official website 

1957 births
Living people
Israeli Jews
Israeli footballers
Maccabi Haifa F.C. players
Israeli expatriate footballers
San Diego Sockers (NASL) players
North American Soccer League (1968–1984) players
Expatriate soccer players in the United States
Israeli expatriate sportspeople in the United States
Liga Leumit players
Association football midfielders